Cyrtodactylus camortensis is a species of gecko endemic to Kamorta, Nicobar Islands.

References

Cyrtodactylus
Reptiles described in 2020